The following is a compilation of notable records and statistics for teams and players in and seasons of Primera División de Nicaragua.

All time League Records

Titles
Most top-flight League titles: 26, Diriangén FC
Most consecutive League titles: 7,
 Real Esteli F.C.

Top flight appearances
 Most Appearances: 80, (1933-)
 Diriangén FC

Goals

Individual
 All-time leading goalscorer: Manuel "Catarrito" Cuadra (742 goals)

Team
 Most league goals scored in a season: 88,
 Fewest league goals scored in a season:
 Most league goals conceded in a season:
 Fewest league goals conceded in a season:,
 Biggest Win:

Records 1933-1994
 Most league goals scored in a season (excluding playoffs): goals, TBD (TBD)
 Fewest league goals scored in a season:TBD (TBD-TBD)
 Most league goals conceded in a season:TBD (TBD-TBD)
 Fewest league goals conceded in a season: 6, TBD (TBD)
 Most goals scored in one season: 44 goals, Oscar "Chiqui" Calvo playing for Flor de Caña in 1967.
 Most goals scored in one game by a player: 6, Manuel “Catarrito” Cuadra vs Corinto
 Biggest Win: UCA 15-1 Esteli, August 6, 1972, and UCA 15-1 Corinto, November 9, 1980
 Record away win:
 Highest scoring game: UCA 15-1 Esteli, August 6, 1972, and UCA 15-1 Corinto, November 9, 1980, and UCA 13-3 ISA, November 23, 1980
 Most wins in a row:
 Most championships won by a player:
 Most Championship by a coach:
 Longest Period of time by a coach (in the first division):
 Most consecutive championship: 5, Diriangén FC (1940, 1941, 1942, 1943, 1944, 1945,)
 Most seasons appearance: 80, Diriangén FC (1933–present)
 Most participants from one place: 
 Most points in a season:  points, TBD (TBD)
 Fewest points in a season:  points, TBD (TBD)
 Most goals scored in a finals game:
 Most goals scored in a final game:
 Highest scoring game in a finals game:
 Most appearances (team) in the finals:
 Most defeats in a final series:
 Most defeats in a final:
 Most appearances in a final series without winning a championship:
 Lowest ranked winners:
 Lowest ranked finalists:
 Biggest win (aggregate): 
 Most final series goals by an individual:
 Most goals by a losing side in a final games:
 Lowest finish by the previous season's champions:
 TBD that have won a championship in the season following their promotion to the Primera. They did so in

Records Short fomat/Clausura and Apertura 1995- 
 Most league goals scored in a season (excluding playoffs): 
 Fewest league goals scored in a season: 
 Most league goals conceded in a season: 
 Fewest league goals conceded in a season:
 Biggest Win: Diriangén FC 14-0 Pinares, February 2, 1997
 Record away win:
 Highest scoring game: Real Estelí F.C. 13-2 Chinandega FC, December 23, 2001
 Most wins in a row:
 Best undefeated streak:
 Most consecutive minutes without conceding a goal : 741 minutes, Denis Espinoza (Deportivo Walter Ferretti , 2014 Apertura).
 Most championships won by a player:
 Most Championship by a coach: 6 by Ramón Otoniel Olivas with Real Esteli F.C.
 Longest Period of time by a coach at one club: 11 years by Mauricio Cruz Jiron with Diriangén FC (1998-2006), (2008-2010)
 Most consecutive championship won under the Clausura/ Apertua Format: 7, Real Esteli F.C. 
 Most seasons in an Apertura/Clausura format:
 Fewest appearances in an Apertura/Clausura format:
 Most participants from one place: 
 Most points in a season:  points, TBD (TBA)
 Fewest points in a season:  points 
 Most goals scored in a finals game: 
 Most goal scored in a final game:
 Most goals scored by one player in a game: 9, José María Bermúdez in 1999
 Most goals scored in a season: 36, Ricardo Vega in Real Esteli F.C. 2008-2009
 Highest scoring game in a finals game: 7, Real Esteli F.C. 6-1 Managua F.C., April 26, 2014
 Most appearances (team) in the finals: 
 Most defeats in a final series: 
 Most defeats in a final: 
 Most appearances in a final series without winning a championship: 
 Lowest ranked winners:
 Lowest ranked finalists:
 Biggest win (aggregate): 
 Most final series goals by an individual:
 Most goals by a losing side in a final games: 
 TBD is the only team that have won a championship in the season following their promotion to the Primera. They did so in
 Lowest finish by the previous season's champions:

Goalscorers Record

Top goal scorers in the Apertura/Clausura Format

External links
  (el nuevo diario)
 

records